Terry Shannon may refer to:

 Terry Shannon (politician) (born 1962), Irish politician and Lord Mayor of Cork.
 Terry Shannon (IT) (1952-2005), American IT consultant and journalist.

See also
Terrence Shannon Jr. (born 2000), American basketball player